Clutterbuck is a surname.

People

Notable persons include:

 Sir Alexander Clutterbuck (1897–1975), British diplomat, high commissioner to Canada and India and ambassador to Ireland
 Andrew Clutterbuck (born 1973), birth name of English actor Andrew Lincoln
Anne Clutterbuck (born 1961), American lawyer and politician
Beryl Markham (1902–1986),  Beryl Clutterbuck, a British-born Kenyan aviator
Bryan Clutterbuck (born 1959), American former baseball player
Cal Clutterbuck (born 1987), Canadian ice hockey player
Charles Edmund Clutterbuck (1806–1861), Stained glass artist
 Sir David Clutterbuck (1913–2008), Royal Navy admiral
Dorothy Clutterbuck (1880–1951), English society lady alleged to be associated with Gerald Gardner and the founding of Wicca
Henry Clutterbuck (1767–1856), English physician and medical writer
Henry Clutterbuck (cricketer) (1809–1883), English cricketer
Henry Clutterbuck (footballer) (1873–1948), English footballer
James Clutterbuck (born 1973), English former cricketer
Katherine Mary Clutterbuck (1860–1946), Anglican nun and Australian education figure
Peter Clutterbuck (born 1868), British colonial civil servant
Richard Clutterbuck (1917–1998), British soldier and academic, scholar of political violence
Robert Clutterbuck (1772–1831), English antiquary and topographer
Thomas Clutterbuck (1697–1742), British politician
Walter Clutterbuck (1894–1987), British Army general

The arts
 Fictional editor of some of Sir Walter Scott's novels, including The Monastery and The Fortunes of Nigel. The Abbot is dedicated by the "author of Waverley" to Captain Clutterbuck
 "Captain Clutterbuck's Treasure", an episode of British sitcom The Last of the Summer Wine
 Clutterbuck, a 1946 play by Benn Levy
 Alice and Fred Clutterbuck, hosts of the eponymous party in the 1968 film ''The Party

See also
 Clatterbuck

Surnames of English origin